Reséndiz is a Spanish surname. Notable people with the surname include:

Ángel Maturino Reséndiz (1960–2006), prolific Mexican serial killer and rapist
Claudia Reséndiz (born 1994), Mexican volleyball player
Javier Martínez Resendiz (born 1988), Mexican professional boxer
Rafael González Reséndiz (born 1979), Mexican politician
Victor Manuel Resendiz (born 1967), Mexican wrestler and actor

Spanish-language surnames
Surnames of Spanish origin